Joel Johnson (born in 1961 in Elmore, Ohio) is a managing director of the Glover Park Group, a strategic communications firm, and former Senior Advisor for Policy and Communications to President Bill Clinton from 1999 to 2001. Johnson has also worked on the staff of former senators Tom Daschle and Howard Metzenbaum. In 2001, he co-founded The Harbour Group, a public relations company, before leaving to join John Kerry's presidential campaign. Johnson became a managing director of the Glover Park Group in 2005.

Federal government 
Johnson joined the staff of Ohio Senator Howard Metzenbaum in 1982, while a student at the University of Maryland. Starting in the mail room, he was later promoted to legislative assistant and then chief of staff. Johnson remained on Metzenbaum's staff until he retired from the Senate in 1994.

In 1994, Johnson assumed the role of executive director of the Democratic Study Group, a legislative service organization in the House of Representatives. The following year, he became an assistant secretary on the staff of South Dakota Senator Tom Daschle. In 1996, Daschle named Johnson the staff director of the Senate Democratic Leadership Committee, specializing in policy and communications strategy. During Johnson's five-year tenure with Daschle, the Pittsburgh Post-Gazette reported that he was a key strategist behind the Democrats' efforts to positively frame their role in the 1995 government shutdown, and he worked on the Democratic Policy Committee as the staff director of leadership communications. He also oversaw the running of the Democratic Senate leadership's television studio, completed in 1996, in the Hart Senate Office Building.

Johnson joined the Clinton administration as a senior legislative advisor in May 1999, handling communications strategies and messaging coordination until Clinton left office in January 2001.

Private sector 
Following the end of Clinton's term in office in 2001, Johnson co-founded The Harbour Group, a public relations firm based in Washington, D.C. He held the role of managing director at the firm, which offers public affairs services including lobbying. At The Harbour Group, Johnson's clients included airlines as well as food processing and pharmaceutical companies. He took a leave of absence from The Harbour Group in 2004 to join the communications team of John Kerry's presidential campaign.

In 2005, Johnson became a managing director of the Glover Park Group. He established the firm's government affairs practice, whose clients have included the Recording Industry Association of America, Nextel Communications, and Sodexho Alliance.

References

External links 
 Glover Park website biography
 Lobbyist profile and photo
 Employment history

1961 births
American political consultants
American public relations people
Clinton administration personnel
Living people
Ohio Democrats
Senior Advisors to the President of the United States
University System of Maryland alumni
People from Elmore, Ohio